Peter Naumann (born 12 October 1941) is a German sailor. He won a silver medal in the Flying Dutchman Class at the 1968 Summer Olympics and a bronze medal at the 1972 Summer Olympics with Ullrich Libor.

References 
 Profile at sports-reference.com

1941 births
Living people
Sportspeople from Hamburg
German male sailors (sport)
Sailors at the 1968 Summer Olympics – Flying Dutchman
Sailors at the 1972 Summer Olympics – Flying Dutchman
Olympic sailors of West Germany
Olympic bronze medalists for West Germany
Olympic silver medalists for West Germany
Olympic medalists in sailing
Medalists at the 1972 Summer Olympics
Medalists at the 1968 Summer Olympics